Davison v. Von Lingen, 113 U.S. 40 (1885), was a United States Supreme Court case.

On 1 August 1879, a charter-party was entered into between the owners of the steam-ship Whickham and the firm of A. Schumacher & Co., composed of George A. Von Lingen, Carl A. Von Lingen, and William G. Atkinson.  The ship was expected to leave Béni Saf in time to reach Philadelphia by August but left later than expected so that the arrival was pushed back to September so the firm hired a different boat.

Decision
The contract was broken when the vessel was found not to have left on time.

See also
List of United States Supreme Court cases, volume 113

References

External links
 

United States Supreme Court cases
United States Supreme Court cases of the Waite Court
United States admiralty case law
United States contract case law
1885 in United States case law
Aïn Témouchent Province
History of Philadelphia